Allepipona splendida is a species of wasp in the Vespidae family. It was described by Gusenleitner in 1997.

References

Potter wasps
Insects described in 1997